The following is a list of episodes from the series Abby Hatcher.

Series overview

Episodes

Season 1 (2019–20)

Season 2 (2020–22)

Shorts (2020)

Notes

References

External links
 
 

Lists of Canadian children's animated television series episodes